Bridgeville Public Library was housed in a historic library building located in Bridgeville, Sussex County, Delaware.  It was built in 1866, and is a -story, three bay, frame structure in the Gothic Revival style. It has a steeply pitched gable roof. There is a one-story gable roofed wing and one-story rear addition. To the front there is a two-story, gable-roofed bell tower and a gable-roofed Colonial Revival open portico. It was originally built to provide a place of worship for the First Presbyterian Church of Bridgeville.  In 1917, the Tuesday Night Club bought the building.  In 1919, the club's Literary Guild organized a circulating library and in 1964, the Tuesday Night Club signed the building over to the Town of Bridgeville for use as a library. The new 13,500 square foot library was opened in 2009. 

It was added to the National Register of Historic Places in 1990.

References

Libraries on the National Register of Historic Places in Delaware
Gothic Revival architecture in Delaware
Cultural infrastructure completed in 1866
Buildings and structures in Sussex County, Delaware
1866 establishments in Delaware
National Register of Historic Places in Sussex County, Delaware
Individually listed contributing properties to historic districts on the National Register in Delaware